Andre Gregory: Before and After Dinner is a 2013 documentary about film and theater director and actor Andre Gregory.

The film was funded through Kickstarter.

References

External links

2013 films
2013 documentary films
American documentary films
2010s English-language films
2010s American films